Blastophysa is a genus of green algae in the class Ulvophyceae. , in AlgaeBase the only species is Blastophysa rhizopus.

References

Ulvophyceae
Ulvophyceae genera
Monotypic algae genera